The Super NES Mouse, sold as the  in Japan, is a peripheral created by Nintendo for the Super Nintendo Entertainment System. It was first released on July 14, 1992, in Japan, in August 1992 in North America, and on December 10, 1992, in Europe. Originally designed for use with the game Mario Paint, the Super NES Mouse was sold in a bundle with the game and included a plastic mouse pad. Soon after its introduction, several other titles were released with Mouse support.

Although this device closely resembles and mimics the functionality of a two-button computer mouse, it was smaller than most computer mice of the time and had a significantly shorter cord than the standard Super NES controller.

The Mario Paint and Mouse package sold more than  units by March 1993.

List of compatible games
The Super NES Mouse was supported by many games during its lifetime, and even by the Super Game Boy accessory. Certain games released after the Mouse—such as Super Mario All-Stars, Tetris & Dr. Mario, Yoshi's Island, and Kirby Super Star—display a warning message indicating that the mouse is incompatible with that game.

This is an incomplete list of games that support the accessory:

 Acme Animation Factory
 Advanced Dungeons & Dragons: Eye of the Beholder
 Alice no Paint Adventure (Japan only)
 Arkanoid: Doh It Again
 Asameshimae Nyanko (Japan only)
 Bishoujo Senshi Sailor Moon S: Kondo wa Puzzle de Oshiokiyo! (Japan only)
 Brandish 2: Expert (Japan only)
 BreakThru!
 Cameltry (called On the Ball in North America and the UK)
 Cannon Fodder (PAL only)
 Dai-3-ji Super Robot Taisen (Japan only)
 Dai-4-ji Super Robot Taisen (Japan only)
 Dōkyūsei 2 (Japan only)
 Doom
 Dragon Knight 4 (Japan only)
 Dynamaite: The Las Vegas (Japan only)
 Farland Story 2 (Japan only)
 Fun 'n Games
 Galaxy Robo (Japan only)
 Hiōden: Mamono-tachi tono Chikai (Japan only)
 J.R.R. Tolkien's The Lord of the Rings: Volume 1
 Jurassic Park
 King Arthur's World
 Koutetsu no Kishi (Japan only)
 Koutetsu no Kishi 2: Sabaku no Rommel Shougun (Japan only)
 Koutetsu no Kishi 3: Gekitotsu Europe Sensen (Japan only)
 Kid Kirby (unreleased)
 Lamborghini American Challenge
 Lemmings 2: The Tribes
 Lord Monarch (Japan only)
 Majin Tensei
 Mario no Super Picross (Japan only)
 Mario Paint
 Mario & Wario (Japan only)
 Mario's Early Years: Fun with Letters
 Mario's Early Years: Fun with Numbers
 Mario's Early Years: Preschool Fun
 Mega lo Mania (PAL only)
 Might and Magic III
 Motoko-chan no Wonder Kitchen (Japan only)
 Nobunaga's Ambition
 Operation Thunderbolt
 Pieces
 Populous II: Trials of the Olympian Gods (PAL only)
 PowerMonger (PAL/Japan)
 Revolution X
 Sangokushi Seishi: Tenbu Spirits (Japan only)
 Sgt. Saunders' Combat! (Japan only)
 Shanghai - Banri no Choujou (Japan only)
 Shanghai III (Japan only)
 Shien's Revenge
 Sid Meier's Civilization
 SimAnt: The Electronic Ant Colony
 Snoopy Concert (Japan only)
 Sound Fantasy (unreleased)
 SpellCraft: Aspects of Valor (unreleased)
 Super Caesars Palace
 Super Castles (Japan only)
 Super Game Boy
 Super Pachi-Slot Mahjong (Japan only)
 Super Robot Taisen EX (Japan only)
 Super Solitaire
 T2: The Arcade Game
 Tin Star
 Tokimeki Memorial: Densetsu no Ni no Shita de (Japan only)
 Troddlers
 Utopia: The Creation of a Nation
 Vegas Stakes
 Warrior of Rome III (unreleased)
 Wolfenstein 3D
 Wonder Project J: Kikai no Shounen Pino (Japan only)
 Zan II Spirits (Japan only)
 Zan III Spirits (Japan only)
 Zico Soccer (Japan only)

References

Super Nintendo Entertainment System accessories
Computer-related introductions in 1992
Computer mice
Nintendo controllers